Ryan Agar and Sebastian Bader were the defending champions, but they did not participate this year.

Dennis Novikov and Julio Peralta won the title, defeating Somdev Devvarman and Sanam Singh in the final, 6–2, 6–4.

Seeds

Draw

References
 Main Draw

Tallahassee Tennis Challenger - Doubles
Tallahassee Tennis Challenger